Burmapogon bruckschi is an extinct species of assassin fly found in Burmese amber.  The species is around 100 million years old.

See also
 List of Asilidae species

References

External links

Burmapogon bruckschi at the Encyclopedia of Life

Cretaceous insects
Insects described in 2014
†
Fossil taxa described in 2014
Cretaceous insects of Asia
Burmese amber
Fossils of Myanmar
Prehistoric Diptera genera